The 1896 Missouri gubernatorial election was held on November 3, 1896 and resulted in a victory for the Democratic nominee, State Treasurer of Missouri Lawrence Vest Stephens, over the Republican candidate Robert E. Lewis, Prohibition candidate Herman Preston Faris, National Democratic candidate J. McDowell Trimble and Socialist Labor candidate Louis C. Fry.

Results

References

Gubernatorial
1896
Missouri
November 1896 events